Colección is a two-disc compilation album from Puerto Rican singer Roy Brown. It features a collection of Brown's hits and old songs, some of them recorded live. The album was released under Brown's label Discos Lara-Yarí in 1996.

Background and recording

Roy Brown describes Colección as a "self-conscious journey" through his career. He says that the album includes songs that are "favorites of the public, others favorites of mine, some forgotten and unknown, others never recorded and that had their chance, even if they never made it to the 'hit parade'".

Most of the songs on Disc one were recorded live. The first eight tracks were recorded during a concert in San Juan in 1993, while tracks nine to eleven were recorded during a presentation in Jayuya in 1992. "Mister con macana" (Track 12) was recorded for this album on E 1212 Studio in 1994. The remaining songs on the first disc ("Oubao-Moin" and "Encántigo") originated from the albums Casi Alba and Aires Bucaneros.

All of the songs on Disc two were taken from Brown's previous albums as well, like Roy Brown III, La Profecía de Urayoán, Nuyol, Árboles, and Balada de Otro Tiempo. The only exception was the song "Monón" (Track 1), which was recorded on Rubby Haddock Studio in 1996.

Track listing

Disc one

Disc two

Personnel and credits 

Disc one (Tracks 1-8)
 Nicky Aponte - musical direction, keyboards, violin
 Tato Santiago - piano and keyboards 
 Eguie Castrillo - percussion 
 Gonchi Sifre - drums 
 Toni Asencio - bass 
 Lissette Gregory - background vocals 
 Aidita Encarnación - background vocals, co-lead on "Seattle"
 Pablito Rosario - percussion 
 Pedrito Guzmán - cuatro
 Angel Morales - live sound
 Hilton Colón - recording

Disc one (Tracks 9-11)
 Nicky Aponte - keyboards, violin
 Tato Santiago - piano
 Eguie Castrillo - percussion
 Gonchi Sifre - drums
 Toni Asencio - bass
 Roy Brown - guitars
 Cholo Echevarría - live sound
 Hilton Colón - recording

Disc one (Track 12)
 Nicky Aponte - keyboards, arrangement
 Tato Santiago - piano, background vocals
 Gonchi Sifre - drums
 Toni Asencio - bass
 Freddy Camacho - percussion
 Cachete Maldonado - percussion
 Zoraida Santiago - background vocals
 Edwin Colón Zayas - cuatro 
 Juancito Torres - trumpet
 Angie Machado - second trumpet
 Rafi Torres - trombone
 Angel Torres - saxophone
 Edgardo Sierra - recording

Disc one (Track 13)
 Zoraida Santiago - co-lead vocals
 Carl Royce - cuatro 
 Pablo Nieves - percussion 
 Harry Rodríguez - bass 
 Roberto Reverón - drums
 Kevin Zambrana - recording

Disc one (Track 14)
 Carl Royce - cuatro 
 Zoraida Santiago - vocals and percussion
 Pablo Nieves - percussion 
 Jesús Sánchez - recording 
 Frank Ferrer - production

Disc two (Track 1)
 Tato Santiago - piano, keyboards
 Gonchi Sifre - drums
 Edgardo Sierra - bass
 Freddy Camacho - percussion
 Roy Brown - guitars
 Iván González - background vocals, collective arrangement
 Víctor "Sonny" Hernández - recording, background vocals

Disc two (Tracks 2, 15)
 Pablo Milanés - co-lead vocals on "Negrito bonito"
 Anabell López - co-lead vocals on "Mujer poetisa"
 Oriente López - keyboards, arrangement
 Oscar Valdés - drums
 Ernán López-Nussa - piano
 Omar Hernández - bass
 Mario Luis Pino - percussion
 Fernando Acosta - saxophone
 Roberto García - trumpet
 Edilio Montero - trumpet and trombone
 Jerzy Belc - recording
 Silvio Rodríguez - producer

Disc two (Track 3)
 Rembert Egues - vibraphone, arrangement
 Carlos Puerto - bass
 Guillermo Barreto - drums
 Chucho Valdés - piano
 Carlos Emilio - guitars
 Oscar Valdés - percussion
 Roberto García Valdés - percussion
 Eusebio Domínguez - recording

Disc two (Tracks 5-6)
 Antonio Cabán Vale - co-lead vocals on "Oda a una generación"
 Henry Vázquez - guitars and quinto
 Rucco Gandía - bass
 Roy Brown - guitars
 Pedrito Enríquez - engineer

Disc two (Tracks 7-11)
 José González - drums and guitars
 Miguel Cubano - guitars and cuatro
 Harry Torres - bass
 Toni Fornaris - percussion
 Emiliano Salvador - piano
 Manuel Valera - soprano sax
 Pedro Téllez - recording
 German Pinelli - production

Disc two (Tracks 13-14)
 Carl Royce - cuatro
 Pablo Nieves - percussion
 Jeff Fuller - bass
 Robi Ameen - drums
 Steve Sandberg - piano
 David Rodríguez - recording

Disc two (Track 12)
 Roy Brown - guitars
 Carl Royce - cuatro
 Pablo Nieves - percussion

Disc two (Track 16)
 Rucco Gandía - bass and production
 Tato Santiago - keyboards
 Pedrito Guzmán - cuatro
 Eguie Castrillo - percussion
 Luis Juliá - guitars
 Jimmy Rivera - drums
 Roy Brown - guitars
 Hilton Colón - recording

Additional production credits
 Digital Recording Services - mastering
 Carlos Rivera - digital editing and restoration
 David Rodríguez - mastering coordination
 Rosalía Ortíz Luquis - cover design
 Ricardo Betancourt - album concept and photography
 Rafael López - photography
 Frida Medin - photography
 Paco López - photography 
 José Rubén Gaztambide - photography

Notes 

1996 compilation albums
Roy Brown (Puerto Rican musician) albums